List of Boys' Singles Junior Grand Slam tournaments tennis champions.

Champions by year

Statistics

Most Grand Slam singles titles

Note: when a tie, the person to reach the mark first is listed first.

Grand Slam singles titles by country (since 1973)

Grand Slam achievements

Grand Slam 
Players who held all four Grand Slam titles simultaneously (in a calendar year).

Career Grand Slam
Players who won all four Grand Slam titles over the course of their careers.
 The event at which the Career Grand Slam was achieved is indicated in bold.

Multiple titles in a season

Three titles in a single season
Note: players who won 4 titles in a season are not included here.

Two titles in a single season
Note: players who won 3+ titles in a season are not included here.

Australian—French:
1952  Ken Rosewall
1961  John Newcombe
1962  John Newcombe (2)
1968  Phil Dent
1997  Daniel ElsnerAustralian—Wimbledon:
1989  Nicklas Kulti
1991  Thomas Enqvist

Australian—U.S.:
1995  Nicolas Kiefer
2000  Andy RoddickFrench—Wimbledon:
1958  Butch Buchholz
1963  Nicky Kalogeropoulos
1966  Vladimir Korotkov
1976  Heinz Günthardt
1978  Ivan Lendl
1979  Ramesh Krishnan
2018  Tseng Chun-hsin

French—U.S.:
1990  Andrea Gaudenzi
2002  Richard GasquetWimbledon—U.S.:
1973  Billy Martin
1974  Billy Martin (2)
1977  Van Winitsky
1982  Pat Cash
2008  Grigor Dimitrov
2012  Filip Peliwo

Surface Slam 
Players who won Grand Slam titles on clay, grass and hard courts in a calendar year.

Channel Slam 
Players who won the French Open-Wimbledon double.

See also 
List of Grand Slam girls' singles champions
List of Grand Slam boys' doubles champions
List of Grand Slam girls' doubles champions

External links
 International Tennis Federation - List of past winners
 TennisProGuru.com - How successful are winners of Junior Grand Slams in Pro Tennis

Boys
boys
BOys